Colette Nelson (born April 5, 1974) is an American professional female bodybuilder and women's physique competitor.

Early life and education
Colette Nelson was born in 1974 in Southfield, Michigan and grew up in Royal Oak. At the age of 12 years, she was diagnosed with type 1 diabetes. Her doctor told her that he would start her on insulin and she has to exercise to keep her blood pressure under control. She attended Clarence M. Kimball High School and graduated as part of the class of 1992. In high school, she became obsessed with exercise, teaching up to 20 aerobics classes a week. She attended Michigan State University where she received a bachelor’s degree in dietetics and a minor in dance. After graduating from college, she moved to New York City to attend New York University. She finished her master's degree in clinical nutrition and became a registered dietician and a certified diabetes educator. She also passed a board certified exam to become a sports dietician.

Bodybuilding career

Amateur
During her freshman year at Michigan State University, at the age of 19 years, she started to develop an interest in weight training when she attended the Powerhouse Gym and encountered her first female bodybuilder working at the front desk of the gym. Prior to weight training, she was an aerobics instructor, who was teaching up to 20 aerobics classes a week, and dancer.

She met a male bodybuilder who began training her and helped with her diet. The male bodybuilder introduced her to a female bodybuilder and suggested they start training five days a week and work one body part a day. She gave up aerobics classes and started serious bodybuilding training.

In 2000, she won the heavyweight class and overall at the Northeastern Championships. That same year she also came in first in heavyweight at the USA Championships. In 2001 and 2002, she came in 1st in the heavyweight class at the USA Championships. In 2004, she won the heavyweight class at the Team Universe. That same year, she won her IFBB pro card at the North American Championships and qualified again for an IFBB pro card when she won the overall at the World Amateur Championships.

Professional

In 2005, Colette attended her first professional competition, the New York Pro, which she placed 5th in the heavyweight class. In 2006, after coming in 3rd place the 2006 Europa Super Show, she qualified for her first Ms. Olympia, which she placed 13th.

Retirement
After competing at the 2010 IFBB Phoenix Pro, Colette retired from bodybuilding to compete in women's physique. She competed in 2014 in the Omaha and Toronto Pro and has now officially retired from competition to focus on her medical career.

Contest history
 1999 Ultimate Bodybuilding Championship – 1st (MW)
 2000 NPC Team Universe – 4th (HW)
 2000 NPC Northeastern Championships – 1st (HW and overall)
 2000 NPC Nationals – 6th (MW)
 2001 NPC USA Championships – 1st (HW)
 2001 IFBB North American Championships – 2nd (HW)
 2001 NPC Nationals – 3rd (HW)
 2002 NPC USA Championships – 1st (HW)
 2003 NPC USA Championships – 2nd (HW)
 2004 NPC Team Universe – 1st (HW)
 2004 IFBB North American Championships – 1st (LHW and overall)
 2004 IFBB World Amateur Championships – 1st (HW and overall)
 2005 IFBB New York Pro – 5th (HW)
 2006 IFBB Europa Super Show – 3rd
 2006 IFBB Atlantic City – 8th
 2006 IFBb Ms. Olympia – 13th
 2007 IFBB Ms. International – 14th
 2008 IFBB Ms. International – 13th
 2008 IFBB New York Pro – 12th
 2010 IFBB New York Pro – 9th
 2010 IFBB Phoenix Pro – 6th

Physique career

Contest history
 2014 IFBB Toronto Pro Supershow – 11th
 2014 IFBB Omaha Pro – 16th

Personal life
Colette currently lives in NYC. She has been in relationships with CEO and founder of RXMuscle Dave Palumbo and IFBB Pro and karate master Bryan Paz for three years. She is a diabetes educator. She helps competitors with diet, training and posing. She performs choreography routines, mix music, and web design for the sites of many athletes as well as corporations. She also owns her own spray tanning business and does hair and make-up for many competitive female bodybuilders.

Media appearances

Filmography

Television

Commercials

See also
Female bodybuilding
List of female professional bodybuilders

References

External links

1974 births
Actresses from Michigan
Actresses from New York City
Actresses from Texas
American female bodybuilders
John McCain 2008 presidential campaign
Living people
Michigan State University alumni
Steinhardt School of Culture, Education, and Human Development alumni
People from Greenwich Village
Sportspeople from Royal Oak, Michigan
Sportspeople from Southfield, Michigan
Professional bodybuilders
Sportspeople from Manhattan
Sportspeople from Nassau County, New York
Sportspeople from New York (state)
Sportspeople from Texas